The following is a list of mayors of Littleton, Colorado.

Littleton, Colorado
Littleton, Colorado